Thryssa malabarica, the Gautama thryssa or Malbar anchovy, is a species of amphidromous ray-finned fish in the family Engraulidae. It is known as Balal parattaya - බළල් පරට්ටයා in Sri Lanka.

Description
It is distributed throughout the Indian Ocean of coast of India, Sri Lanka, and possibly Pakistan. It is a small schooling fish found in depth of 20-50m. Maximum length do not exceed 17.5 cm. The fish lack dorsal soft rays and only present 34 to 38 anal soft rays. There are 23 to 26 keeled scutes on belly. The characteristic feature to identify the fish is the presence of a dark blotch behind upper part of gill opening, and spots on cheeks and paired fins. Gill arches are pinky orange in color.

References

IUCN Red List
Anchovy

Fish of Thailand
Taxa named by Marcus Elieser Bloch
Fish described in 1795
malabarica